Nam Kul (also Romanized as Nām Kūl; also known as ʿAbdāl ʿAlī Karīmī, Nām Kūl-e ‘Olyā, and Nūn Kūl) is a village in Zirtang Rural District, Kunani District, Kuhdasht County, Lorestan Province, Iran. At the 2006 census, its population was 724, in 151 families.

References 

Towns and villages in Kuhdasht County